Mozid Mahmud (born 16 April 1966) is a Bangladeshi poet and essayist. He is recognized as a major poet of the 1980s, with more than thirty books to his credit.

Biography
Mozid Mahmud is the pen name of Mohammad Abdul Mozid. He was born in 1966 at Chargorgori, a village thirteen km west of Pabna in East Pakistan, to the family of Mohammad Keramat Ali Biswas and Sanowara Begum.

Education
He completed his early education in the local school and college. In 1986, he crossed the Jamuna and went to capital Dhaka, where he attended the University of Dhaka to receive an MA degree in Bengali literature and language in 1989 with a First Class.
He was awarded a research grant by the Nazrul Institute in 1996, the result of which was Nazrul: Spokesman of the Third World (Nazrul: Tritiya Bishwer Mukhopatro; 1997) published from the same institute. He also awarded a research fellow by the University Grand commission, the result of which was Travelodge of Tagore (Rabindranather Vraman Sahitya 2010).

Career
A journalist by profession, he carefully escapes the arena of popular and prosaic day-to-day information that the job deserves, and dives into the invincible deep of poetic inspiration from where he collects pebbles of pictures, aroma of feelings and intense fabric of thought, after which an automatic mental process of jeopardizing them continues in its own accord. He taught Bengali literature at some colleges and universities for almost five years.

Activism
Mozid Mahmud has been working with poor and vulnerable people in Bangladesh, especially destitute northern part of the country from two decades. He established Organization for Social Advancement & Cultural Activities (OSACA) a non-government organisation which is fighting for hunger and legal rights.

Publications

Poetry
 Boutubani Fuler Deshe (In the World of the Boutubanis) 1985
 Mahfuja Mongol, 1989
 Goshther Dikey (Towards the Pasture), 1996
 Ball Upakhyan (Odyssey of a Ball), 2001
 Apple Kahinee (Story of an Apple), 2002
 Dhatri clinicer Janma (The birth of maternity Clinic), 2007
 Singha o Gardobher Kabita (Poems of Lion and Dunky), 2012

Mahfuza Mangal
Majid Mahmud's book of poetry is a dedication to 'Mahfuza', following the trend of poetry and songs dedicated to gods and goddesses of religions and sects of the subcontinent. The poetry dedicated to gods and goddesses was for relief from the vagaries of nature. Majid Mahmud's poetry is passionate as images continue in their contortions. The space between man and gods and goddess resonates with the enormity of infinity and eternity. This collection is the edition published on the twenty-fifth anniversary of the first publication of the book in February 1989. After that there have been three more editions.

Novel
Poet and essayist Mozid Mahmud’s novel titled Memorial Club is scheduled to hit Amar Ekushey Book Fair 2021. It is the first novel of Mozid, who has received huge response penning the collection of poems titled Mahfujamangal.

Essays, researches and narrative prose
 Nazrul: Tritiya Bishwer Mukhopatro (Nazrul: Spokesman of the Third World), 1997
 Rabindranather Vraman Sahitya (Travelodge of Tagore), 2010
 Keno Kabi Keno Kabi Nay (Why Poet or Not), 2002
 Uttar Uponibesh Sahitya O Onyano (Post-Colonial Literature and Others), 2006
 Bhasar Adhipatya (Dominations of Language), 2005
 Rabindranath and Bharat Barso, 2011.

Short stories and fiction
 Makarsha o Rajanigandha (Spider and Tube-rose), 1986
 Memorial Club, 2010

Edited books
 Brikha Bhalobaser Kabita ( The Anthology of Affection to Three), 2000
 Jamrul Hasan Beg Smarak Grontha (A book on Jamrul Hasan Beg), 2003
 Rabindranather Bhroman Sahitya (Travelogues of Tagore) 2010
 Ashir dashoker Kabi o Kabita (Poems of Eighties), 1990

Journals and magazines
 Bangla Literature (1997), editor, a poetry journal
 Parbo, editor, a literary periodical journal (publishing 2005 to till)

Awards
 Poet Binay Majumder, Literary Award, Kolkata, 2011
 National Press Club Award, 2008
 Poet bande Ali Literary Award, 1988
 Poet Manjus Dash Literary Award, Kolkata, 2004
 Poet Mojibur Rahman, Literary Award, 2005
 Poet Mokbul Hossain Literary Award, 1999
 Arunima Literary Award, 2012
 Rabindra Nazrul Literary Award, 2006
 Bengali Community Literary Honor from Delhi, 2010
 Bengali Writers Honor from London, 2010
 Jibanananda Das Award, 2015, Kokata, India

References

Further reading 
 মজিদ মাহমুদের কবিতা : নান্দনিকতার ধারাভাষ্য
 অভিনয়ে কবি মজিদ মাহমুদ, প্রিয় ডট কম (Bengali newspaper)
 "Poet Mahjid Mahmud", Bengala News 24 (Bengali news outlet)
 বাংলা বায়োগ্রাফি, পরস্পর
 মজিদ মাহমুদ, BD News (Bengali news outlet)
 মাছরাঙ্গার আয়োজনে কবি মজিদ মাহমুদ 2, TV discussion about Mahmud, and subsequent interview
 অভিনয়ে কবি মজিদ মাহমুদ, priyo.com (Bengali news outlet)

External links
 YouTube
 Rokomari
 News of Mozid Mahmud
 Interview
 Poetry

Bangladeshi male poets
1966 births
Living people
People from Pabna District